is a district of Shibuya, Tokyo, Japan. As of October 2020, the population of this district is 634. The postal code for Jinnan is 150–0041.

Local landmarks in Jinnan include NHK Broadcasting Center, the Yoyogi National Gymnasium and Yoyogi Park. The nearest train stations are Shibuya and Harajuku.

Education
 operates public elementary and junior high schools.
All of Jinnan (1 and 2 chome) is zoned to Jinnan Elementary School (神南小学校), and Shoto Junior High School (松濤中学校).

Gallery

References

Neighborhoods of Tokyo
Districts of Shibuya